Guangdong Institute of Science and Technology is a provincial university located in the Tianhe District of Guangzhou City, Guangdong Province, China.

History 
The university was established in 1985 by the provincial government. It offers undergraduate and postgraduate programmes in science, engineering and technology.

References

External links 
Guangdong Institute of Science and Technology

Universities and colleges in Guangzhou
Educational institutions established in 1985
1986 establishments in China